Sosa-gu was a district of the city of Bucheon in Gyeonggi-do, South Korea.  'So' is a Chinese character that means white and 'sa' means sand.  Many years ago, there were many streams in this region which is why it is named so.

The district was abolished in July 2016 as Bucheon became a unified city without any administrative districts.

Administrative divisions
Sosa-gu was divided into the following "dong"s.
Goean-dong
Beombak-dong (Divided in turn into Beombak-dong, Gyesu-dong and Okgil-dong)
Simgokbon-dong
Simgokbon 1-dong
Yeokgok 3-dong
Sosabon 1 to 3 Dong
Songnae 1 and 2 Dong

See also
Bucheon
Ojeong-gu
Wonmi-gu

References

Bucheon
Districts in Gyeonggi Province
2016 disestablishments in South Korea